Watch It is a 1993 American comedy film written and directed by Tom Flynn and starring Peter Gallagher, Suzy Amis, John C. McGinley, Jon Tenney, Cynthia Stevenson, Lili Taylor and Tom Sizemore.

Plot
Perpetual man-child Mike (Jon Tenney) breaks up with his mature, pretty girlfriend, Anne (Suzy Amis), but doesn't have to dwell on it, thanks to Danny (Tom Sizemore) and Rick (John C. McGinley), both of whom share his immaturity and fear of emotional intimacy. Roommates in a Chicago house, they play an ongoing game called "Watch It!" involving pranks. But "Watch It!" stops being harmless fun when Mike's more soulful cousin, John (Peter Gallagher), moves in and takes an interest in Anne.

Cast
Peter Gallagher as John
Suzy Amis as Anne
John C. McGinley as Rick
Jon Tenney as Michael
Cynthia Stevenson as Ellen
Lili Taylor as Brenda
Tom Sizemore as Danny

Reception
The film has a 56% rating on Rotten Tomatoes.  Roger Ebert awarded the film two and a half stars.  Owen Gleiberman of Entertainment Weekly graded the film a B+.

References

External links
 
 

American comedy films
1993 comedy films
1993 films
Films scored by Stanley Clarke
1990s English-language films
1990s American films